Kamenný Újezd is a municipality and village in Rokycany District in the Plzeň Region of the Czech Republic. It has about 900 inhabitants.

Administrative parts

The village of Kocanda is an administrative part of Kamenný Újezd.

Etymology
To distinguish from other villages called Újezd, the place began to be called Kamenný Újezd (lit. "Stone Újezd") because of the stony soil in the area and its surroundings.

Geography
It lies in the Švihov Highlands. The Klabava River flows through the municipality. The built-up area is located in the river valley and forms a contiguous built-up area together with Rokycany and Hrádek.

History
The first mention of the area of Kamenný Újezd is from 1177, when Duke Soběslav II promised this land to its soldier. The first written mention of the already existing village of Kamenný Újezd is from 1368. In 1498, King Vladislaus II confirmed that the village was part of the Rokycany estate. It remained part of Rokycany until abolition of feudal administration in 1850.

Local economy was based both on agriculture and on industry. The industry was represented by iron ore mining and wood processing from nearby forests. In the agriculture the village specialized in sheep farming, which is symbolized by ram's horns in its coat of arms.

19th and 20th century brought population increase and gradual transformation of Kamenný Újezd into semi-urban community influenced by proximity of industrial town of Rokycany. In 1868, Rokycany–Mirošov railway opened, initially for cargo transportation only. In May 1945 both American and Soviet armies reached Kamenný Újezd during liberation of Czechoslovakia in final days of World War II.

For a short period between 1980 and 1990, the village was merged with Rokycany, but later seceded and became again a separate municipality.

Demographics

Transport
Kamenný Újezd lies on the railway line of local importance leading from Rokycany to Mirošov.

References

External links

Populated places in Rokycany District